This list of churches in Jammerbugt Municipality lists church buildings in Jammerbugt Municipality, Denmark.

National Churches

Aaby Church

Aaby Church is located in Aabybro. It is the only national church in Aaby Parish. The church has a churchyard with a cemetery.

The church was built in the 1100s.

Alstrup Church

Alstrup Church is located in Alstrup. It is the only national church in Alstrup Parish. The church has a churchyard with a cemetery.

The church was built around year 1200.

The pulpit is from the 1700s. It depicts the symbols of the Four Evangelists.

Bejstrup Church

Bejstrup Church is located in Bejstrup. It is the only national church in Bejstrup Parish. The church has a churchyard with a cemetery.

The church was built in the 1100s. The current church tower is from 1874, having replaced an older tower.

The pulpit is from 1584 and the altar piece is from the late 1500s.

Biersted Church

Biersted Church is located approximately 700 meters east of Biersted. It is the only national church in Biersted Parish. The church has a churchyard with a cemetery.

Brovst Church

Brovst Church is located in Brovst. It is the only national church in Brovst Parish. The church has a churchyard with a cemetery.

Fjerritslev Church

Fjerritslev Church is located in Fjerritslev. It is one of two national churches in Kollerup-Fjerritslev Parish.

The church was constructed in 1907 and first opened on 22 December 1907. It was built by architect Kristoffer Nyrop Varming.

The altarpiece is made by Johannes Wilhjelm and the baptismal font by Anders Bundgaard.

Gjøl Church

Gjøl Church is located in Gjøl. It is the only national church in Gjøl Parish. The church has a churchyard with a cemetery.

The church was constructed around year 1130. The church was expanded in 1450 and the church porch was built around year 1873.

Gøttrup Church

Gøttrup Church is located in Gøttrup. It is the only national church in Gøttrup Parish. The church has a churchyard with a cemetery.The nave and the aspe of the church was made in the 11th century and it as was concecrated by St. Laurentius. The bell in the church has the inscription “Hail the Star of the Sea, Jesus the Nazarene, the Jews’ King, St. Laurentius”.

The altarpiece is from 1585. The pulpit is from 1579. The bell is from around 1500 and was made by Albert Poulsen.

Haverslev Church

Haverslev Church is located 1 km north of Haverslev. It is the only national church in Haverslev Parish. The church has a churchyard with a cemetery.

Hjortdal Church

Hjortdal Church is located around 400 meters west of Hjortdal. It is the only national church in Hjortdal Parish. The church has a churchyard with a cemetery.

The church was built in the 1100s. The church porch was built in 1586.

The altarpiece is from 1942. The pulpit is from 1592.

Hune Church

Hune Church, also known as Church of Our Lady (Danish: Vor Frue Kirke), is located in Hune. It is one of two national churches in Hune Parish. The church has a churchyard with a cemetery.

The choir, apse and nave are from around 1100, with extensions added later.

A runestone is located in the ship's church porch. The church has two bells: one from 1475 and one from 1969.

Ingstrup Church

Ingstrup Church is located in Ingstrup. It is the only national church in Ingstrup Parish. The church has a churchyard with a cemetery.

The church was built around year 1100.

The altar is in granite. The altarpiece is from the 1500s.

Jetsmark Church

Jetsmark Church is located in Pandrup. It is the only national church in Jetsmark Parish. The church has a churchyard with a cemetery.

The church was built around year 1150.

A runestone is located in the church porch. There are two bells in the church. One was built in 1802 by Peder Meielstrup in Randers. It was donated by Catharina Elisabeth Scheel (née Cicignon). The other bell is from 1961 from Aalborg. It was donated by Peder Larsen Knudsen.

Kettrup Church

Kettrup Church is located in Kettrup. It is the only national church in Kettrup Parish. The church has a churchyard with a cemetery.

The church's nave and choir were built in the 1100s, with the church porch and tower added later. 

The altarpiece is from 1612.

Klim Church

Klim Church, also known as Nørre Kirke (Danish: Northern Church), is located in Klim. It is the only national church in Klim Parish, though an independent church is also located in the parish. The church has a churchyard with a cemetery.

The church was built in the 1100s. The church porch was built in 1870.

The altarpiece is from around 1600. The pulpit is from around 1610.

Koldmose Church

Koldmose Church is located 5 km north-west of Tranum and 6 km north of Brovst. It is the only national church in Koldmose Parish. The church has a churchyard with a cemetery.

Kollerup Church

Kollerup Church is located in Kollerup. It is one of two national churches in Kollerup-Fjerritslev Parish. The church has a churchyard with a cemetery.

The church was built in the 1100s.

The altarpiece is from 1883. The pulpit is from 1599.

Langeslund Church

Langeslund Church is located in Arentsminde. It is the only national church in Langeslund Parish. The church has a churchyard with a cemetery.

Lerup Church

Lerup Church is located 3 km east of Tranum. It is the only national church in Lerup Parish. The church has a churchyard with a cemetery.

Oxholm Church

Oxholm Church, also known as Øland Church, is located at the manor of Oxholm, 2 km north-west of Østerby. It is the only national church in Øland Parish. The church has a churchyard with a cemetery.

The church was built in the 1400s.

Rødhus Church

Rødhus Church is located in Rødhus. It is one of two national churches in Hune Parish.

Saltum Church

Saltum Church is located in Saltum. It is the only national church in Saltum Parish. The church has a churchyard with a cemetery.

The church was built around 1150 and rebuilt around 1450.

Skræm Church

Skræm Church is located in Skræm. It is the only national church in Skræm Parish. The church has a churchyard with a cemetery.

The church was built in the 1100s. The tower is from 1949.

The altarpiece is from 1679.

Torslev Church

Torslev Church is located in Torslev. It is the only national church in Torslev Parish. The church has a churchyard with a cemetery.

Tranum Church

Tranum Church is located in Tranum. It is the only national church in Tranum Parish. The church has a churchyard with a cemetery.

Vedsted Church

Vedsted Church is located in Birkelse. It is the only national church in Vedsted Parish. The church has a churchyard with a cemetery.

The church was built in 1899 by architect Hans V. Ahlmann. The church was renovated in 1974 and again in 2014.

The altarpiece is from the 2014 renovations. It was painted by Arne Haugen Sørensen.

Vester Hjermitslev Church

Vester Hjermitslev Church is located in Vester Hjermitslev. It is the only national church in Vester Hjermitslev Parish. The church has a churchyard with a cemetery.

The church was built around year 1200.

Vester Torup Church

Vester Torup Church, also known as Torup Church, is located in Vester Torup. It is the only national church in Vester Torup Parish. The church has a churchyard with a cemetery.

The church was built in the 1100s, with the tower built around year 1500.

Vust Church

Vust Church is located in Vust. It is the only national church in Vust Parish. The church has a churchyard with a cemetery.

The church was built in the 1100s. The tower is from around year 1500.

Øster Svenstrup Church

Øster Svenstrup Church is located in Øster Svenstrup. It is the only national church in Øster Svenstrup Parish. The church has a churchyard with a cemetery.

Independent churches

Klim Independent Church

Klim Independent Church, also known as Morten Luther Church and Sønderkirke (Danish: Southern Church), is located in Klim. It is one of two churches in Klim Parish, though being an independent church it isn't affiliated with the parish. The church has a churchyard with a cemetery.

The church was built in 1883 and first opened on 10 November same year. The tower was built in 1919. It was built by artisan Andreas Bentsen.

The baptismal font is from 1883. The altarpiece is from 1908 and painted by Tony Müller.

Other churches

Brovst Baptist Church

Brovst Baptist Church is located in Brovst.

Pandrup-Birkelse Baptist Church

Pandrup-Birkelse Baptist Church is located in Pandrup.

Saltum Baptist Church

Saltum Baptist Church is located in Saltum.

Zion Church

The Zion Church is located in Brovst.

References

Buildings and structures in Jammerbugt Municipality
Jammerbugt